Chrysochloroma is a genus of moths in the family Geometridae.

Species
 Chrysochloroma megaloptera (Lower, 1894)

References
 Chyrsochloroma at Markku Savela's Lepidoptera and Some Other Life Forms
 Natural History Museum Lepidoptera genus database

Geometrinae